Archips myrrhophanes is a species of moth of the family Tortricidae. It is found in China (Sichuan, Zhejiang, Jiangxi, Fujian, Zhejiang) and Taiwan.

The length of the forewings is 7–10 mm for males and 9–11 mm for females. The forewings are brown with stripes of silver scales. The hindwings are greyish brown.

References

Moths described in 1931
Archips
Moths of Asia